Derrick Clifton Harriott OD (born 10 February 1942) is a Jamaican singer and record producer. He was a member of the Jiving Juniors with Herman Sang before embarking on a solo career. He has produced recordings by Big Youth, Chariot Riders, The Chosen Few, Dennis Brown, The Ethiopians, Keith & Tex, The Kingstonians, Rudy Mills, Scotty, Sly & Revolutionaries, and Winston McAnuff.

Biography

The Jiving Juniors
As a student at Excelsior High School, Harriott formed a duo with Claude Sang Jr. Harriott entered the Vere Johns Opportunity Hour talent contest as a solo artist in 1955, failing to reach the final round, and entered again in 1957 as a duo with Sang, going on to win several times. The duo first recorded for Stanley Motta, and went on to record for several producers, having hits including "Daffodil" and "Birds of Britain" before splitting up when Sang's job took him overseas.

In 1958 Harriott formed the Jiving Juniors with Eugene Dwyer, Herman Sang (Claude's younger brother), and Maurice Wynter. The group had success on the Vere Johns Opportunity Hour, and in 1960 and 1961 had hit singles with "Lollipop Girl" (for Duke Reid) and "Over The River" (aka "I'll Be Here When He Comes", for Coxsone Dodd). The group split up after Harriott emigrated to the United States, although the other members continued for a while with Jimmy Mudahy replacing Harriott. After struggling to find work, Harriott reformed the Jiving Juniors with a new line-up, having already teamed up again with Claude Sang in New York. The new line-up included Winston Service and Valmont Burke, and split their time between Jamaica and New York, where they recorded at the Mirasound Studios, having hits including "Sugar Dandy". The travelling took its toll and the group split up in 1962.

Solo and production career

Harriott embarked on a solo career and later formed his own record label, Crystal. His first solo release, "I Care", was a hit, with further hits following with "What Can I Do" (1964), "The Jerk" (1965) and "I'm Only Human" (1965), all of which were included on his debut album, The Best of Derrick Harriott. In 1967 he had further solo hits with "The Loser" and "Solomon", as well as with productions of other artists, including The Ethiopians' "No Baptism", and Keith And Tex's "Tonight" and "Stop That Train".

The lyrics to his song "Message from a Black Man" (circa 1970) echoed the growing black consciousness in American soul music of that time. In 1970 he issued The Crystalites' The Undertaker, an instrumental album in a similar vein to the early music of The Upsetters. He produced successful albums by other artists, including DJ Scotty's Schooldays, Dennis Brown's Super Reggae and Soul Hits, and also his own 14 Chartbuster Hits.

In 1971, Swing magazine named Harriott the Top Producer of 1970. He was one of the first producers to use King Tubby mixing talents at his Waterhouse studio, issuing one of the earliest dub albums in 1974: Scrub A Dub, credited to The Crystallites. Harriott followed this with another dub/instrumental album, More Scrubbing The Dub. His late 1970s productions used backing from The Revolutionaries on albums such as Winston McAnuff's Pick Hits To Click (1978), DJ Ray I's Rasta Revival (1978) and his own Enter The Chariot and Disco 6 (a compilation album featuring Dennis Brown, Cornell Campbell and Horace Andy). In the 1970s he opened his first record shop on King Street in Kingston, later moving to larger premises at Twin Gates Plaza in Half-Way Tree.

In the 1980s, he continued to have hits with soul cover versions, such as "Skin To Skin" and "Checking Out". In 1988 he scored with "Starting All Over Again", a duet with Yellowman, with lyrics about Hurricane Gilbert. The mid to late 1990s saw solo efforts such as Sings Jamaican Rock Steady Reggae, For a Fistful of Dollars, Derrick Harriott & Giants, and Riding the Roots Chariot being released.

In July 2002 in Toronto, Ontario, Canada, Harriott performed at the two-night Legends of Ska festival. Other performers included: Skatalites, Rico Rodriguez, Lester Sterling, Johnny Moore, Lynn Taitt, Prince Buster, Alton Ellis, Lord Creator, Justin Hinds, Derrick Morgan and Lord Tanamo.

In 2009, Harriott was awarded the Order of Distinction by the Jamaican government, and in 2019 he received a Lifetime Achievement Award in Music from the Jamaica Reggae Industry Association (JaRIA).

Discography

Albums
 The Best of Derrick Harriott – 1965 – Island
 The Best of Derrick Harriott Volume 2 – 1968 – Trojan
 Sings Jamaican Reggae – 1969 – Crystal/Pama
 The Crystalites – Undertaker – 1970 Trojan
 Psychedelic Train – 1970 – Crystal/Trojan
 Presents Scrub-A-Dub Reggae – 1974 – Crystal
 More Scrubbing The Dub – 1975 – Crystal
 Songs For Midnight Lovers – 1976 – Crystal/Trojan
 Derrick Harriott & The Revolutionaries – Reggae Chart Busters Seventies Style – 1977
 Reggae Disco Rockers – 1977 – Charmers
 Born to Love You – 1979 – Crystal

Compilation albums
 Derrick Harriott & Various Artists – 14 Chartbuster Hits – 1973 – Crystal
 Derrick Harriott & The Crystalites / Chariot Riders – 1970 – Blockbuster Reggae Instrumentals
 Greatest Reggae Hits – 1975 – Crystal/Trojan
 Disco 6 – 1977
 Enter The Chariot – 1978
 Derrick Harriott & Various Artists – Those Reggae Oldies – 1978
 Derrick Harriott & The Jiving Juniors – The Donkey Years 1961–1965 – Jamaican Gold (1993)
 Derrick Harriott & Various Artists – Step Softly 1965–1972 – Trojan (1988)
 Derrick Harriott – Sings Jamaican Rock Steady Reggae – Jamaican Gold
 Derrick Harriott & The Crystalites – For A Fistful of Dollars – Jamaican Gold
 From Chariot's Vault Volume 2: 16 Reggae Hits – Jamaican Gold
 Derrick Harriott & Various Artists – Riding the Roots Chariot – 1998 – Pressure Sounds
 Derrick Harriott & Various Artists – Skin To Skin – 1989 – Sarge
 Derrick Harriott & Various Artists – Musical Chariot'' – 1990 – Charly Records

See also
List of reggae musicians
Island Records discography
List of Jamaican record producers
List of Jamaican backing bands

References

External links
Pressure Sounds biography of Harriott
Derrick Harriott & The Jiving Juniors I
Derrick Harriott & The Jiving Juniors II

1939 births
Jamaican reggae musicians
Jamaican male singers
Jamaican record producers
Living people